"All the Way" is a song recorded by Canadian country music artist Jason McCoy. It was released in 1996 as the seventh single from his second studio album, Jason McCoy (1995). It peaked at number 4 on the RPM Country Tracks chart in July 1996.

Chart performance

Year-end charts

References

1995 songs
1996 singles
Jason McCoy songs
MCA Records singles
Songs written by Chris Lindsey
Songs written by Jason McCoy